The 2007 ATS F3 cup was the fifth edition of the German F3 Cup. It commenced on 28 April 2007 and ended on 30 September after eighteen races. The title was won by Carlo van Dam in penultimate Sachsenring round.

Teams and drivers

Calendar
With the exception of two rounds at TT Circuit Assen, all rounds took place on German soil.

Results

Standings

ATS Formel 3 Cup

Points are awarded as follows:

ATS Formel 3 Trophy

Points are awarded as follows:

† — Drivers did not finish the race, but were classified as they completed over 90% of the race distance.

ATS Formel 3 Junior-Pokal (Rookie)
Points are awarded for both races as follows:

† — Drivers did not finish the race, but were classified as they completed over 90% of the race distance.

References

External links
 

German Formula Three Championship seasons
Formula Three season
German
German Formula 3 Championship